The Appalachian State Mountaineers are the athletic teams that represent Appalachian State University in Boone, North Carolina, United States. The Mountaineers compete in Division I of the National Collegiate Athletic Association (NCAA) and were a member of the Southern Conference (SoCon) between 1972 and 2014. On July 1, 2014, Appalachian State moved to the Sun Belt Conference. Appalachian State fields varsity teams in 17 sports, 7 for men and 10 for women. The football team competes in the Division I Football Bowl Subdivision (FBS), formerly I-A, as a result of the transition to the Sun Belt. The wrestling team remains in the Southern Conference because the Sun Belt does not sponsor the sport. In field hockey, another sport not sponsored by the Sun Belt, Appalachian State  joined the Mid-American Conference for the 2017 season after playing two seasons as an independent following the demise of its former league, the Northern Pacific Field Hockey Conference (NorPac). Appalachian State has Sun Belt rivalries with all of the East Division schools (Coastal Carolina, Georgia Southern, Georgia State, Troy, and South Alabama). Appalachian State's main Sun Belt rivals are Coastal Carolina, Georgia Southern, Louisiana, as well as a rekindled rivalry from the days in FCS with future Sun Belt member Marshall.

Appalachian State's football program has been successful with the Mountaineers winning three straight national championships in 2005, 2006, and 2007. They are the only team in North Carolina, public or private, to win an NCAA national championship in football. The Mountaineers are the first FCS team to win three straight national championships since the creation of Division I-AA in 1978, and are the first Division I program to win three consecutive national championships since Army accomplished the feat in 1944, 1945, and 1946.

Football home games are played at Kidd Brewer Stadium, while basketball, volleyball, and indoor track and field events are held at the George M. Holmes Convocation Center. The school's baseball team plays at Jim and Bettie Smith Stadium.

On May 26, 2020, Appalachian State announced that it would discontinue the men's soccer, indoor track and field, and tennis varsity teams effective immediately due to budget cuts resulting from the COVID-19 pandemic.

Sports sponsored

Baseball 

Appalachian's first baseball team took the field in 1903. The Mountaineers are coached by Kermit Smith.  The Mountaineers won regular season conference titles in 1973, 1984, 1985, 1986, 1987, and 2012. They also won the Southern Conference baseball tournament in 1984 and most recently on May 18, 2012, the Appalachian State Baseball team beat Western Carolina University, becoming Southern Conference baseball champs.

Men's basketball 

The head coach of the Appalachian State men's basketball team is currently Dustin Kerns, previously of the Presbyterian Blue Hose. Notable past coaches include Press Maravich and Bobby Cremins. The Mountaineers have appeared in the NCAA tournament three times, 1979, 2000, and 2021 and appeared in the National Invitation Tournament in 2007. Appalachian State plays all home basketball games at the George M. Holmes Convocation Center, having opened in 2000 to replace Varsity Gymnasium on the campus of Appalachian State University.

Women's basketball 

The Appalachian State women's basketball team, coached by Angel Elderkin, was one of the top teams in the Southern Conference, laying claim to six SoCon tournament titles and six regular season championships in a 26-year span. On February 19, 2011, the Appalachian State Mountaineer Women's Basketball Team won the 2011 Southern Conference regular season title, the last time they had won the title was 1996.

Football 

The Mountaineers are led by head coach Shawn Clark. The 2005, 2006, and 2007 seasons were successful, with the Mountaineers winning three consecutive FCS national championships. Before Appalachian left the Southern Conference for the Sun Belt Conference and FBS football in 2014, it had developed intense rivalries with fellow conference members Furman, Georgia Southern, and Western Carolina, The Appalachian–Georgia Southern rivalry continues in FBS, as both teams moved together to the Sun Belt. The Mountaineers and Catamounts played annually for the Old Mountain Jug until Appalachian's departure for the Sun Belt.

The Mountaineers achieved perhaps their biggest win in program history with a road upset of the fifth-ranked Michigan Wolverines, 34–32, on September 1, 2007. With the win Appalachian became the first ever FCS (I-AA) team to defeat an AP nationally ranked FBS (I-A) team. This victory was seen by some analysts to be one of the greatest upsets in NCAA football history. Following the win, they were featured on the cover of the following week's issue of Sports Illustrated.

Numerous players from ASU have gone on to play in the National Football League. They include Harold Alexander, Kerry Brown, Dexter Coakley, Dino Hackett, Larry Hand, Jason Hunter, Dexter Jackson, Corey Lynch, Rico Mack, Marques Murrell, Mark Royals, John Settle, Matt Stevens, Troy Albea, Daniel Wilcox, and Armanti Edwards.

Field hockey 
The women's field hockey team were members of the single-sport Northern Pacific Field Hockey Conference (NorPac) until that league's demise after the 2014 season, playing the next two seasons as a Division I independent, as the Sun Belt does not sponsor this sport. The Mountaineers joined the Mid-American Conference as an affiliate starting in 2017.

Wrestling 

The Mountaineers wrestling team is coached by JohnMark Bentley and holds their home matches in Varsity Gymnasium. Notable former Mountaineer wrestlers include former Olympians – Al Crawford (1948), Herb Singerman (1968), Ike Anderson (1988 and 1992), and Dale Oliver (1988). In 2017, Denzel Dejournette was named an All-American, the first wrestler to earn the honor since Kyle Blevins and Austin Trotman in 2012. Wrestling participates in the Southern Conference as the Sun Belt Conference does not sponsor wrestling.

Softball

Championships

NCAA team championships 
Appalachian State has won three NCAA team national championships.

Men's (3)
Football (FCS) (3): 2005, 2006, 2007
see also:
Sun Belt Conference NCAA team championships
List of NCAA schools with the most NCAA Division I championships

Commissioner's and Germann Cup 
During Appalachian's 43-year tenure in the Southern Conference, the Commissioner's and Germann Cups were awarded each year to the top men's and women's program in the league. The Commissioner's Cup was inaugurated in 1970. The Germann Cup, named for former conference commissioner Ken Germann, was first awarded in 1987. The Apps won the Commissioner's Cup 34 times, more than any other Southern Conference institution.

Facilities

Media
Audio and video of games and events can be accessed at the internet home of Appalachian State Mountaineers athletics.

The Appalachian IMG Sports Network is a network of radio stations that can be heard across seven states in the southeast United States.

Pageantry

Yosef

Yosef is the mascot for Appalachian State. The origin of the name Yosef comes from mountain talk for "yourself", the idea being that if you are a fan, friend or alumnus and have a heart of black and gold, you are Yosef. Yosef first appeared in the 1942 edition of The Rhododendron, Appalachian's annual yearbook. He was presented as a member of the freshman class with the name Dan'l Boone Yoseff from Appalachian. The second "f" was dropped from Yoseff in January 1947. Since his inception, Yosef has gone through many appearance changes with the current design being adopted prior to the 1983–84-year. The 2006 football season saw the return of Yosef's rifle which was fired after every Appalachian touchdown.

References

External links